Mount Stubberud is a mountain, 2,970 m, standing 2 nautical miles (3.7 km) southeast of Beck Peak on a ridge from the north side of Nilsen Plateau, in the Queen Maud Mountains. Mapped by United States Geological Survey (USGS) from surveys and U.S. Navy air photos, 1960–64. Named by Advisory Committee on Antarctic Names (US-ACAN) for Jorgen Stubberud, carpenter on the ship Fram and member of the land party at Framheim on Amundsen's expedition of 1910–12. This naming preserves the spirit of Amundsen's 1911 commemoration of "Mount J. Stubberud," a name applied for an unidentifiable mountain in the general area.

Mountains of the Ross Dependency
Amundsen Coast